Pterostylis crassichila, commonly known as the plump northern greenhood, is a species of orchid endemic to Queensland. It has a rosette of leaves at the base of the plant and a single white flower with green lines, reddish towards its tip. It grows in higher areas of north Queensland.

Description
The dorsal sepal and petals are fused, forming a hood or "galea" over the column. The dorsal sepal is about the same length as the petals. There is a wide gap between the galea and the lateral sepals. Flowering occurs from April to July.

Taxonomy and naming
Pterostylis crassichila was first formally described in 2006 by David Jones and the description was published in Australian Orchid Research from a specimen collected near Herberton. The specific epithet (crassichila) is derived from the Latin word crassus meaning "thick" and the Ancient Greek word cheilos meaning "lip".

Distribution and habitat
The plump northern greenhood grows in the Tablelands Region of north Queensland among grasses and small shrubs in moist, sheltered places in open forest above .

References

crassichila
Endemic orchids of Australia
Orchids of Queensland
Plants described in 2006